The 20th National Hockey League All-Star Game was played in Montreal Forum on January 18, 1967, where the host Montreal Canadiens defeated a team of all-stars from the remaining NHL teams 3–0. It was the first, and to date, only time a shutout occurred in an All-Star Game. It was the first All-Star Game held in mid-season. The previous Game was held in October 1965.

The game
The game was considered a dull affair by the writers. Only three minor penalties were called. Montreal's John Ferguson scored two goals and punched Norm Ullman to earn a penalty. The All-Stars' coach, Sid Abel, chose New York's Ed Giacomin over his own goalie Roger Crozier, who had been playoff MVP in the previous playoffs. Bobby Orr was not chosen to the game, as the selections were to be based on the previous season's performance.

Game summary

MVP: Henri Richard, Montreal Canadiens
Attendance: 14,284

Source: Podnieks

Rosters

Note: G = Goalkeeper, D = Defence, C = Centre, LW = Left Wing, RW = Right Wing
Source: Podnieks

See also
1966–67 NHL season

References
 

Notes:

All-Star Game
National Hockey League All-Star Games
1967
Ice hockey competitions in Montreal
National Hockey League All-Star Game
1960s in Montreal
1967 in Quebec